Arthur Fleming Fazzin (May 1, 1924 – April 25, 1995) was an American actor and television host. He hosted the first version of the television game show Jeopardy!, which aired on NBC from 1964 until 1975 and again from 1978 to 1979.

Early life
Fleming was born in New York City. His parents, William and Marie Fazzin, had immigrated to the United States from Austria. They were a popular dance team in Europe and brought their show to America. Their son Art was a varsity letterman football player at James Monroe High School in New York City, standing , weighing . He later attended Colgate and Cornell Universities, starring on the football team, as well as water polo teams at both colleges. Fleming was a World War II veteran who served in the U.S. Navy for three and a half years as the pilot of a patrol bomber in the Atlantic.

Career
After leaving the Navy, Fleming became an announcer at a radio station in Rocky Mount, North Carolina. Here, he changed his name to "Art Fleming". His radio career later took him to Akron, Ohio, and back home to New York. He was the first announcer to deliver the slogan "Winston tastes good, like a cigarette should" for Winston cigarettes.

Fleming's acting career began at age four, when he appeared in a Broadway musical. His first television role was as a stunt double for Ralph Bellamy in the detective series Man Against Crime. In 1959 he starred as detective Ken Franklin in the ABC TV series International Detective, credited as Arthur Fleming. He also played attorney Jeremy Pitt in The Californians, an NBC Western set in San Francisco during the gold rush of the 1850s.

Fleming also appeared in many television commercials, in addition to anchoring the eleven o’clock news on WNBC. He was first spotted by Merv Griffin on a commercial for Trans World Airlines. Griffin thought Fleming was "authoritative, yet warm and interesting", and Fleming was invited to audition to be the host of Griffin's new game show Jeopardy!. Fleming won the job, and hosted the show during its original run of March 30, 1964, to January 3, 1975, and again from October 2, 1978, to March 2, 1979. Rather than describe him as the "host" of the program, announcer Don Pardo introduced him by saying, "and here's the star of Jeopardy!, Art Fleming" As "the world's greatest quiz show's" first host, Fleming earned two Emmy Award nominations. While he was host of Jeopardy!, Fleming never missed a taping.

Because he hosted a quiz show, and in part because he was an avid reader with multiple college degrees, Fleming earned a reputation as being a storehouse of trivia. While appearing as a guest star on Hollywood Squares (another NBC game show in the 1960s and 1970s), Fleming was once selected as the "secret square". His question was, "In 1938, who won the Wimbledon women's tennis championship?" Fleming picked Helen Wills Moody, one of the three choices read to him. The female contestant (who had selected Fleming) turned to Hollywood Squares MC Peter Marshall, saying, "Art Fleming would never lie! I agree!" He was right, and the contestant won $11,000. Fleming later said he did not know a thing about tennis and had guessed the answer. He hoped the contestant would disagree, thinking he was wrong.

Throughout his career, Fleming starred in about 5,000 episodes of television programs and 48 motion pictures. After Jeopardy!'s first cancellation in 1975, Fleming returned to acting. In 1977 he played the role of W. Averell Harriman in the movie MacArthur starring Gregory Peck, and appeared in the comedy film American Raspberry, and also appeared in episodes of Starsky and Hutch, Kingston: Confidential, and the 1976 TV miniseries The Moneychangers.

Fleming also hosted a radio version of College Bowl for CBS Radio from 1979 to 1982. He hosted the NBC radio weekend magazine Monitor during 1972. Fleming reprised his role as host of Jeopardy! in the 1982 movie Airplane II: The Sequel and in "Weird Al" Yankovic's music video "I Lost on Jeopardy". Fleming was also often called upon to host mock versions of Jeopardy! at trade shows and conventions.

Fleming declined an offer to reprise his role as Jeopardy! host when Merv Griffin began developing a revival of the show in 1983. As a result, Alex Trebek (a personal friend of Fleming's) took the position instead and continued to host the program until his death in 2020. In interviews conducted in the early years of the Trebek version, he stated that he disliked the show's new direction and the various changes that the revival's producers had made. He disapproved of moving production from his native New York to Los Angeles, suggesting to a Sports Illustrated journalist in 1989 that filming in California made the show feel superficial and anti-intellectual:

 

He also claimed that the new show was too easy and he feuded publicly with the staff of the modern Jeopardy! over the nature of the clues, as he believed that the writers were inserting hints into the clues to make the correct response seem obvious and easy to guess.

From 1979 to until his retirement in 1992, Fleming hosted a daily radio talk show on KMOX in St. Louis. On Sunday evenings, he occasionally co-hosted Trivia Spectacular with David Strauss, a St. Louis schoolteacher. He also hosted the syndicated radio program When Radio Was, as well as two installments of the PBS science program NOVA as part of the National Science Test, where a studio audience tested their knowledge of science against a celebrity panel.

Personal life
Fleming married Mildred Goodrich in 1946 in North Carolina. They had a daughter Jan. In 1954 he married actress Peggy Ann Ellis, who worked on The Merv Griffin Show. Fleming denied having any children in a 1974 interview, conducted after his divorce from Ellis. Despite insisting he would never marry again after his divorce from Ellis, Fleming married Becky Lynn in a private ceremony at Norman Vincent Peale's home. He soon adopted Becky's two children from a prior marriage. Together they had five grandchildren. In 1992, Fleming retired and the family moved to Crystal River, Florida. He remained active in charity work: he hosted fundraising videos for the Citrus County United Way and became involved with the Citrus County Abuse Shelter Association, Inc. (where Becky served as director). He also hosted a syndicated television program, called Senior America, which showcased seniors and senior activities.

Death
Fleming died of pancreatic cancer at his home in Florida on April 25, 1995, six days before his 71st birthday. According to his obituary in the Los Angeles Times, he had been diagnosed with cancer two weeks before his death. He was cremated and his ashes were scattered at sea. Twenty-five years later, his successor on Jeopardy!, Alex Trebek, succumbed to the same disease on November 8, 2020, at the age of 80.

Partial filmography

Sources

External links

1924 births
1995 deaths
20th-century American male actors
American game show hosts
American talk radio hosts
American people of Austrian descent
Deaths from cancer in Florida
Deaths from pancreatic cancer
Entertainers from New York City
James Monroe High School (New York City) alumni
Jeopardy!
Male actors from Akron, Ohio
Military personnel from New York City
People from Crystal River, Florida
Radio personalities from St. Louis
United States Navy bomber pilots of World War II